Zwerdling is a surname. Notable people with the surname include:

Allen Zwerdling (1922–2009), American journalist
Daniel Zwerdling, American journalist

See also
 Zwerling